Metalton is an unincorporated community in Raleigh County, West Virginia, United States.

The community most likely was so named on account of nearby coal and steel manufacturing.

References 

Unincorporated communities in West Virginia
Coal towns in West Virginia
Unincorporated communities in Raleigh County, West Virginia